The National Sports Awards is the collective name given to the six sports awards of Republic of India. It is awarded annually by the Ministry of Youth Affairs and Sports. They are presented by the President of India in the same ceremony at the Rashtrapati Bhavan usually on 29th August each year along with the national adventure award. , a total of fifty-five individuals have been awarded the various National Sports Awards in parasports. The four awards presented in parasports are Major Dhyan Chand Khel Ratna, Arjuna Award, Dhyan Chand Award and Dronacharya Award.

First presented in the year 1974, a total of forty-three individuals have been honoured with the Arjuna Award in parasports for their "good performance at the international level" over the period of last four years, with two individuals being awarded for their lifetime contribution. First presented in the year 2012, a total of four coaches have been honoured with the Dronacharya Award in parasports for their "outstanding work on a consistent basis and enabling sportspersons to excel in international events" over the period of last four years, with one coach being awarded in the lifetime contribution category. First presented in the year 2017, a total of eight sportspersons have been honoured with the Rajiv Gandhi Khel Ratna, the highest sporting honour of India, in parasports for their "most outstanding performance at the international level" over the period of last four years. First presented in the year 2004, a total of five retired sportspersons have been honoured with the Dhyan Chand Award, the lifetime achievement sporting honour of India, in parasports for their "good performance at the international level and their continued contributions to the promotion of sports even after their career as a sportsperson is over."

Recipients

Explanatory Notes

Reference

External links
Official Website

Indian sports trophies and awards
Ministry of Youth Affairs and Sports